The 2010 Brno Superbike World Championship round was the ninth round of the 2010 Superbike World Championship season. It took place on the weekend of July 9–11, 2010 at the Masaryk Circuit located in Brno.

Results

Superbike race 1 classification

Superbike race 2 classification

Supersport race classification

External links
 The official website of the Superbike World Championship

Brno
Brno Superbike World Championship round